Shlomo Bar (1943- ) is an Israeli musician, composer, and social activist. He is a pioneer of ethnic music in Israel.

Biography 
Shlomo Bar was born in Rabat, Morocco. His family immigrated to Israel when he was six. He learned how to play the darbuka and other ethnic percussion instruments, performing in various small lineups and as a backing musician for artists such as Matti Caspi on tours. In 1976 he played in Yehoshua Sobol and Noa Chelton's Kriza (Nerves), a play about social injustice and discrimination again Mizrahi Jews in Israel. Bar set to music and performed several of Sobol's songs, including "Yeladim Ze Simcha" (Children are joy).

Bar then formed his own group, "Habrera Hativeet" (literally, "Natural Selection," but they call themselves "Natural Gathering") with bassist and producer Yisrael Borochov. The original lineup was Samson Kehimkar, an Indian violin and sitar virtuoso, Miguel Herstein, an American guitarist, the bassist Yisrael Borochov, and Bar on percussion and vocals. Yisrael Borochov had a stark influence on the sound of the group, and before he left had arranged, recorded and produced the first two albums of the band. Disagreements over where the direction of the band was going led him to split from Bar and to form the East West Ensemble. 

The first album, "Elei Shorashim" (Origins, or a Return to Roots), combined traditional Moroccan and Yiddish music, with Indian elements and motifs, as well as new renditions of songs by Israeli poets. The songs were long, some of them running for eight minutes, and the subject matter was unusual for the time.

The lineup went through several changes in the 1980s and 90s. 

Bar's musical influences are broad, including Bob Dylan and Miles Davis on the one hand, and classical Indian music and Jewish liturgy on the other.

Discography 
With Habrera Hativeet:

1979 - "Elei Shorashim" (Origins)
 Tfila - A Prayer
 Children Are Happiness - Yeladim Ze Simcha
 In The Village Of Todra - Ezleinu Bikfar Todra
 Dror Yikra
 Kotzim - Thorns
 A Moroccan Wedding - Hatuna Marokait

1980 - "Mechakim LeSamson" (Waiting for Samson)
 Hassidic Dialogue - Du siah Hassidi
 Spring - Aviv (Bhairavi)
 The Love Of Theresa Dimon - Ahavata Shel Theresa Dimon
 Walking to Caesarea - Halicha LeKeisaria
 The Dark Girl - Shecharhoret
 Be True - Heye Davek
 Alone - Levad

1982 - "Chut Shazur" (Woven Thread)
 The Market Song - Shir Hashuk
 Sultanas Lament - Kinat Sultana
 To God I Shall Hearken - El El Ashacher
 Who Knew - Mi Yada
 Bread and Garment - Lehem Beged
 Haji Baba
 My Field - Shdemati

1985 - "Mitoch Kelim Shvurim" (Out of Broken Vessels)
 Thou Art Land - At Adama
 Danino the Immigrant's Run - Ritzato Shel Haole Danino
 Or Haganuz
 Hama
 My Love Shall Come to His Garden - Yavo Dodi Legano
 A Song of Degrees - Shir Lamaalot
 
1988 - "Michutz LaChomot" (Outside the Walls)
 Who's There - Mi Shama
 When Shall Zion be Established - Matai Techonan Ir Tzion
 E'eroch Mahalal Nivi 
 The Flute - Hehalil 
 An Air - Neima 
 Your Fingers - Et Etsbeoteicha 

1991 - "Nedudim" (Wandering) 
 A Seed Sleeps - Yashen Lo Garin 
 Naked and Bare - Erom VeEria 
 Walking to Caesarea - Halicha LeKeisaria 
 I Am an Innocent Girl - Ani Tama 
 Seven Sections - Shiv'a Medorim 
 Wandering - Nedudim 
 Three Were Founded - Shlosha Nosdu 
 Honi The Circle Drawer - Honi Hameagel
 Reaching an Understanding - Hidavrut  

1993 - "Peimot Shchorot" (Black Beats) 
 Yafa Ahuvati - Beautiful is My Beloved 
 My Land to The Redeemer - Artzi Lagoel 
 The Desert Speaks - Hamidbar Medaber 
 10/14 (a percussion piece)  
 And Then As Stream Waters - Veaz Kemei Nahal 
 Hamsa 
 A Song For Peace - Shir Lashalom 
 For Thou Art a Man - Ki Ata Adam 
 Black Beats - Peimot Shhorot (a percussion piece) 

1994 - "David U Shlomo" (David and Solomon) - with David D'Or 
 Halleluijah - Haleluya 
 A Voice From the Heavens - Kol Mehashamayim 
 In the Village of Todra - Etzlenu Bikfar Todra 
 In Your Heart - Belibech 
 My Field - Shdemati 
 Don't Cast Me Off - Al Tashlicheni 
 Protect the World - Shmor Al Haolam 
 The Mercy Gate - Shaar Harachamim 
 A Song For Peace - Shir Lashalom 
 The Sailor's Love - Ahuvat Hasapan 
 Instrumental 
 A Prayer - Tfila 
 Comes From Love - Baa Me'ahava 
 Tfila 
 He Will Come - Hu Yavo

1996 - "Yachef" (Barefoot) 
 My Heart - Libi 
 The hope of God - Tikvat Hael   
 Walking to the Palace (Instrumental) - Halicha Laarmon  
 Neglected - Mezulzelet  
 He is Great - Adir Hu   
 The Immigrant Danino's Run - Ritsato Shel Haole Danino 
 A close friend - Haver Karov   
 Batash (Lit. meaning: A meeting between two elements)  
 Reveal The Story - Saper Saper 
 Lover of My Soul - Yedid Nefesh 
 Barefoot - Yahef  

2003 - "Maim Ne'emanim" (Faithful Waters) - A Collection 

CD1 
 Tfila 
 Yeladim Ze Simcha 
 Etzleinu Bikfar Todra 
 Kinat Sultana 
 Dror Ikra 
 Hatuna Marokait 
 Sheharhoret 
 Ahavata Shel Teresa Dimon 
 Shir Hashuk 
 Hagi Baba 
 Mi Yada 
 Ritzato Shel Haole Danino 
 At Adama 
 El El Ashacher 

CD2
 A Song of Yearning - Shir Kmiha 
 A Japanese Legend - Agada Yapanit 
 Et Etsbeoteicha 
 Hahalil 
 Halicha Lekeisaria 
 Erom Veeria 
 Hamidbar Medaber 
 Shdemati 
 Honi Hameagel 
 Ani Tama 
 Saper Saper 
 Yedid Nefesh 
 Mezulzelet 
 Haver karov 
 Zemer Nouge 

2006 - "Ananim Nemuhim" (Low Clouds) 
 Low Clouds - Ananim Nemuchim
 Genesis (Light) - Or (Bereshit)
 The Seagulls - HaSchafim
 And again - Veshuv 
 Da-re 
 Woman's poem - Shirat Isha
 The Noon-Land's song - Shir Admat Hatzehoraim 
 Circles - Maagalim
 Formless and Void - Tohu Vavohu  

2010 - "Besod Tfilat Arar" (In a Secret of Solitary Prayer)

References

External links 
 
 The MOOMA database (Heb)
 A recent interview (Heb)
 Bar on his Biblical heroes. (Heb)

1943 births
Living people
Israeli male composers
Moroccan emigrants to Israel
Israeli people of Moroccan-Jewish descent
Jewish Israeli musicians
20th-century Israeli male musicians
21st-century Israeli male musicians
20th-century Israeli composers
21st-century Israeli composers
21st-century Moroccan Jews
People from Rabat
People from Sderot